The American Athletic Conference (The American) gives five football awards at the conclusion of every season. The awards were first given in 2013, following the restructuring of the Big East Conference. The awards existed in the same format in the Big East from 1991 to 2012.

The five awards include Offensive Player of the Year, Defensive Player of the Year, Special Teams Player of the Year, Rookie of the Year, and Coach of the Year. Recipients are selected by the votes of the conference's head coaches.

Offensive Player of the Year
The Offensive Player of the Year is awarded to the player voted most outstanding at an offensive position.

Winners

Winners by school

Defensive Player of the Year
The Defensive Player of the Year is awarded to the player voted most outstanding at a defensive position.

Winners

Winners by school

Special Teams Player of the Year
The Special Teams Player of the Year award is given to the player voted best on special teams. The recipient can either be a placekicker, punter, returner, or a position known as a gunner.

Winners

Winners by school

Rookie of the Year
The Rookie of the Year award is given to the conference's best freshman.

Winners

Winners by school

Coach of the Year
George O'Leary won the first award with UCF after an 11–1 regular season in which UCF earned The American's last automatic berth to a BCS bowl game, the first major bowl appearance in school history.

Winners
Records reflect those at the time of selection, and do not include the conference championship game, the Army–Navy Game (which takes place a week after the conference title game), or bowl games.

Winners by school

Footnotes
 Louisville left The American for the Atlantic Coast Conference (ACC) after 2013.

References

College football conference awards and honors
American Athletic Conference football